Boris Ivanovich Orlovsky (1790s – 28 December 1837) was a Russian Neoclassical sculptor.

Biography 
Born into a serf peasant family in Tula, Russia, his artistic talent led to him being freed by his master and sent to the Imperial Academy of Arts in Saint Petersburg. After studying for six years in Italy under Bertel Thorvaldsen, he returned to teach at the Academy where he later became a Professor. At the same time, he improved his skill in the studios of Santino Campioni and Agostino Triscorni. Boris Orlovsky died in 1837 in Saint Petersburg.

Orlovsky's statues of Kutuzov and Barclay de Tolly in front of the Kazan Cathedral reveal a realistic undercurrent in his otherwise Neoclassical work, typified by the Angel on top of the Alexander Column at the Palace Square.

External links 
 

1837 deaths
19th-century sculptors from the Russian Empire
19th-century male artists from the Russian Empire
Russian male sculptors
Neoclassical sculptors
Burials at Tikhvin Cemetery
Year of birth uncertain